is a passenger railway station located in the city of Susaki, Kōchi Prefecture, Japan. It is operated by JR Shikoku and has the station number "K17".

Lines

In addition to the local trains on the Dosan Line, some trains from the following limited express services also stop at the station:

Layout
The station, which is unstaffed, consists of two opposed side platforms serving two tracks. A station building linked to platform 1 serves as a waiting room. Access to platform 2 across the tracks is by means of ramps and a level crossing. A footbridge allows pedestrian access to the station entrance from the main road on the other side of the tracks.

Adjacent stations

History
 was opened on 20 June 1942 along the existing Dosan Line track. The facility was closed on 1 September 1945 but reopened on 10 July 1946. On 1 June 1947, it was upgraded to a full passenger station. At that time, the station was operated by Japanese National Railways (JNR).  With the privatization of JNR on 1 April 1987, control of the station passed to JR Shikoku and JR Freight. Freight operations ceased on 1 October 1992.

Surrounding area
Sumitomo Osaka Cement Kochi Factory
Kuroshio Suzaki Hospital

See also
 List of Railway Stations in Japan

References

External links

 JR Shikoku timetable

Railway stations in Kōchi Prefecture
Railway stations in Japan opened in 1947
Susaki, Kōchi